Million Model Catwalk is a campaign website for Fashion Targets Breast Cancer UK. The website was launched on 7 April 2009 by Breakthrough Breast Cancer and forms part of the charity's annual promotional activities within the UK.

The website offers women the opportunity to interact with the brand by creating an online avatar version of themselves which involves uploading their photo, choosing an outfit from the 2009 Fashion Targets Breast Cancer range and then taking part in a virtual catwalk debut alongside nine celebrities who are supporting the campaign: Leah Wood, Sarah, Duchess of York, Jade Jagger, Bryan Ferry, Abigail Clancy, Sara Cox, June Sarpong, Duncan James and Mark Foster (swimmer).  

Million Model Catwalk also features fashion advice and Spring/Summer trends from stylist Gerry DeVeaux, celebrity footage, behind-the-scenes celebrity gossip from the campaign fashion shoot, and the complete Fashion Targets Breast Cancer product range which features an instant ‘click to buy’ mechanic linking through directly to retailer websites. Everything in the range carries a 30% donation to Breakthrough Breast Cancer.

References

External links
 Million Model Catwalk
 Fashion Targets Breast Cancer UK
 Breakthrough Breast Cancer 

British fundraising websites